Portland is a census-designated place (CDP) comprising the primary village and adjacent residential land in the town of Portland, Middlesex County, Connecticut, United States. It is in the southwest part of the town, bordered to the west and south by the Connecticut River, which forms the border with Cromwell to the west and Middletown to the south. The Portland CDP extends north along Main Street (Connecticut Route 17A) to its junction with Gospel Lane (Connecticut Route 17) at Fogelmarks Corners, and the eastern extent of the CDP is at Rose Hill Road and Collins Hill Road. The CDP includes the neighborhood of Gildersleeve in the north. 

As of the 2020 census, the CDP had a population of 5,813, out of 9,384 in the entire town of Portland.

References 

Census-designated places in Middlesex County, Connecticut
Census-designated places in Connecticut